Ian Patrick Clark (born March 7, 1991) is an American professional basketball player for the Adelaide 36ers of the Australian National Basketball League (NBL). He played college basketball at Belmont University. As a senior, he was the 2012–13 Ohio Valley Conference Co-Player of the Year with Murray State's Isaiah Canaan. Clark was third in the nation in three-point field goal shooting percentage and led the Bruins to the conference championship in the school's first year as an OVC member. In July 2013, Clark signed a two-year contract with the Jazz after his performance at the Las Vegas Summer League impressed numerous teams. Clark won an NBA Championship with the Warriors in 2017.

High school career
Clark was a four-year varsity letter winner at Germantown High School in Germantown, Tennessee. In his final three seasons he led the team in scoring, culminating in a senior season that saw him average 23 points, 5 rebounds and 5 assists per game. He was a three-time all-metro selection by The Commercial Appeal, and in 2009 he was an all-region selection. His Belmont player biography describes him in high school as "A dynamic, multi-dimensional guard who could make an instant impact on both ends of the floor."

College career
When Clark enrolled at Belmont University as a freshman in 2009–10, the school was still in the Atlantic Sun Conference (A-Sun). He made an immediate impact as its Freshman of the Year as well as being named to the A-Sun Second Team. He averaged 14.9 points and 3.3 rebounds per game and was named a Mid-Major Freshman All-American by CollegeInsider.com. The following year, Clark was named to the A-Sun First Team as the Bruins went 19–1 in conference play to win the A-Sun regular season championship. They also won the conference tournament championship and Clark was named to the all-tournament team. The Bruins earned an automatic berth into the NCAA Tournament but lost to Wisconsin in the Round of 64.

In 2011–12, for the second season in a row, Clark was named to the A-Sun's First Team. The Bruins also repeated as regular season and conference tournament champions, qualified for the NCAA Tournament, but once again lost in the Round of 64. In Belmont's last season in the Atlantic Sun Conference, Clark averaged 12.7 points, 2.6 rebounds, 2.4 assists and 1.0 steals per game. In his final collegiate season in 2012–13, the team moved into the Ohio Valley Conference, and Clark led Belmont to their third straight regular season and conference championships, thus a third straight automatic bid to the NCAA Tournament. In the 2013 OVC championship game, Clark out-dueled 2012 OVC Player of the Year and consensus All-American, Isaiah Canaan, as the Bruins prevailed 70–68 in overtime. The Bruins lost in the NCAA Tournament's Round of 64 to Arizona, however. For the year, Clark averaged 18.2 points, 3.3 rebounds, 2.4 assists and 1.6 steals; he also shot 45.9% from beyond the arc, which was good enough to be ranked third nationally. At the end of the season he was named the Co-OVC Player of the Year with Canaan as well as the OVC's Defensive Player of the Year.

Professional career

Utah Jazz (2013–2015)
After going undrafted in the 2013 NBA draft, Clark signed to play in both NBA Summer Leagues, for the Miami Heat and then for the Golden State Warriors. He subsequently won the Most Valuable Player of the Las Vegas Summer League championship game as he led the Warriors with 33 points, helping them defeat the Phoenix Suns 91–77. On July 29, Clark signed a two-year contract with the Utah Jazz after his performance in Las Vegas impressed numerous teams.

On December 14, 2013, Clark was assigned to the Bakersfield Jam of the NBA Development League. He was recalled by the Jazz on December 21, reassigned on January 4, and recalled again on January 13.

On February 24, 2015, Clark was assigned to the Idaho Stampede. On March 17, he was recalled by the Jazz. On March 26, he was waived by the Jazz.

Denver Nuggets (2015)
On March 28, 2015, Clark was claimed off waivers by the Denver Nuggets.

Golden State Warriors (2015–2017)
On September 25, 2015, Clark signed with the Golden State Warriors. On December 30, 2015, he scored a then career-high 21 points in a 114–91 loss to the Dallas Mavericks. On April 13, 2016, the Warriors broke the single season record with 73 wins, eclipsing the 72 wins set by the 1995–96 Chicago Bulls. The Warriors made it to the 2016 NBA Finals after overcoming a 3–1 deficit to the Oklahoma City Thunder in the Western Conference Finals to win the series in seven games. Clark made his first appearance in the NBA Finals during a Game 1 victory over the Cleveland Cavaliers. The Warriors were defeated by the Cavaliers in seven games.

On July 8, 2016, Clark re-signed with the Warriors. On November 1, 2016, he scored a career-high 22 points in a 127–104 win over the Portland Trail Blazers. He topped that mark on December 17, 2016, scoring 23 points in a 135–90 win over the Portland Trail Blazers. On March 11, 2017, Clark set a new career high with 36 points in a 107–85 loss to the San Antonio Spurs. The Warriors finished the season as the first seed in the West with a 67–15 record. Following a 129–115 victory in Game 4 of the Western Conference Finals over the San Antonio Spurs, the Warriors reached their third straight NBA Finals series while becoming the first team in league history to start the playoffs 12–0. Clark won his first championship with the Warriors with a 4–1 series win over the Cleveland Cavaliers in the 2017 NBA Finals. The Warriors finished the playoffs with a 16–1 record, the best postseason winning percentage in NBA history.

New Orleans Pelicans (2017–2019)
On August 3, 2017, Clark signed with the New Orleans Pelicans. On January 30, 2018, he scored a season-high 20 points in a 114–103 loss to the Sacramento Kings.

On July 9, 2018, Clark re-signed with the Pelicans.

Xinjiang Flying Tigers (2019–2021)
On July 30, 2019, Xinjiang Flying Tigers was reported to have signed Clark. He played for the Tigers in the 2020 season as a foreign player.

Sydney Kings (2022)
On February 12, 2022, Clark signed with the Sydney Kings of the Australian National Basketball League (NBL) for the rest of the 2021–22 season. He helped the Kings win the NBL championship in May 2022.

Adelaide 36ers (2022–present)
On December 20, 2022, Clark signed with the Adelaide 36ers for the rest of the 2022–23 NBL season.

NBA career statistics

Regular season

|-
| style="text-align:left;"| 
| style="text-align:left;"| Utah
| 23 || 0 || 7.5 || .388 || .355 || .714 || .8 || .7 || .3 || .1 || 3.0
|-
| style="text-align:left;"| 
| style="text-align:left;"| Utah
| 23 || 0 || 7.0 || .341 || .360 || 1.000 || .6 || .4 || .3 || .1 || 1.9
|-
| style="text-align:left;"| 
| style="text-align:left;"| Denver
| 7 || 0 || 4.4 || .364 || .200 || 1.000 || .4 || .3 || .4 || .1 || 1.9
|-
| style="text-align:left;"| 
| style="text-align:left;"| Golden State
| 66 || 1 || 8.8 || .441 || .357 || .824 || 1.0 || 1.0 || .3 || .2 || 3.6
|-
| style="text-align:left;background:#afe6ba;"| †
| style="text-align:left;"| Golden State
| 77 || 0 || 14.8 || .487 || .374 || .759 || 1.6 || 1.2 || .5 || .1 || 6.8
|-
| style="text-align:left;"| 
| style="text-align:left;"| New Orleans
| 74 || 2 || 19.7 || .448 || .318 || .763 || 1.7 || 1.5 || .4 || .1 || 7.4
|-
| style="text-align:left;"| 
| style="text-align:left;"| New Orleans
| 60 || 6 || 16.2 || .394 || .327 || .893 || 1.5 || 1.6 || .4 || .1 || 6.7
|- class="sortbottom"
| style="text-align:center;" colspan="2" | Career
| 330 || 9 || 13.7 || .439 || .340 || .804 || 1.3 || 1.2 || .4 || .1 || 5.6

Playoffs

|-
| style="text-align:left;"| 2016
| style="text-align:left;"| Golden State
| 16 || 0 || 9.6 || .491 || .333 || .800 || 1.1 || 1.0 || .5 || .0 || 4.1
|-
| style="text-align:left;background:#afe6ba;"| 2017†
| style="text-align:left;"| Golden State
| 16 || 0 || 13.7 || .506 || .361 || .941 || 1.6 || .7 || .4 || .0 || 6.8
|-
| style="text-align:left;"| 2018
| style="text-align:left;"| New Orleans
| 9 || 0 || 21.1 || .424 || .357 || 1.000 || 1.1 || 1.2 || .9 || .2 || 7.8
|- class="sortbottom"
| align="center" colspan=2| Career
| 41 || 0 || 13.7 || .475 || .354 || .903 || 1.3 || .9 || .5 || .0 || 6.0

References

External links

Belmont player bio
Overlooked by big programs, Ian Clark powering Belmont to stellar season

1991 births
Living people
Adelaide 36ers players
African-American basketball players
American expatriate basketball people in Australia
American expatriate basketball people in China
American men's basketball players
Bakersfield Jam players
Basketball players from Memphis, Tennessee
Belmont Bruins men's basketball players
Denver Nuggets players
Golden State Warriors players
Idaho Stampede players
New Orleans Pelicans players
People from Germantown, Tennessee
Shooting guards
Sydney Kings players
Undrafted National Basketball Association players
Utah Jazz players
Xinjiang Flying Tigers players
21st-century African-American sportspeople